Fazıl (also, Fazil and Fazyl) is a village and municipality in the Shaki Rayon of Azerbaijan.  It has a population of 380.

References 

Populated places in Shaki District